Dyson is a Singapore-based company and manufacturer of bagless vacuum cleaners (using cyclonic separation and brushless electric motors), heatless hand dryers, bladeless fans/heaters, and robotic vacuum cleaners.

Technologies 
Dyson has developed various basic technologies for use in their products, including designing and manufacturing its own specialized motors.

Dyson Digital Motor 
The electric motor marketed as the Dyson Digital Motor (DDM) is a direct current motor, operating on the switched reluctance principle. These brushless motors rotate at up to 110,000 rpm. The motor used a two-pole brushless rotor with a digital controller. Dyson said its efficiency was 84%, which was less than the 96% efficiency that is achieved in some brushless designs. In order to deal with the high speed and centrifugal forces, the impeller is made of carbon fibre reinforced polymer; the shaft is steel.

The first mass-produced version was named "X020" and used in the Airblade hand dryer; the later DDM "V2" was used for Dyson handheld vacuum cleaners. Dyson has continued to develop its proprietary motor designs for various products, improving efficiency for increased battery life, and reducing acoustic noise, resulting in a "V8" version (for cordless vacuums) and a "V9" version (for a hair dryer), .

Root Cyclone technology 
The Dyson Root Cyclone technology is used in all Dyson vacuum cleaners from DC07 onward. The DC17, DC22, and DC23 use the improved "Root Cyclone & Core Separator", also called "Radix Cyclone", "Intermediary Cyclone", or "Level 3 Root Cyclone Technology".

Most of the current range use "2 Tier Radial cyclones", consisting of two cascaded levels of cyclonic separators to remove dirt and dust without requiring a bag or filter.

Vacuum cleaners

Model names 

Most versions are identified by a name such as "DC14". Later upright and cylinder cleaners have labels such as "Small Ball" or "Big Ball" which relate to the machine's form factor. Cordless vacuum cleaners are identified by names such as "V11" or "V7" which denote the version of the appliance (the higher the model number, the greater its specification). Older cordless models pre-dating the Dyson V6 have names in the "DC14" style.

Some have submodels identified by a suffix indicating specific facilities, implemented sometimes by additional tools supplied. Suffixes with the same meaning vary from model to model.

 All Floors, Multi Floor, Wood+Wool: suitable for both hard surfaces and carpets.
 Allergy: suitable for filtering out microscopic allergens.
 Animal: designed to pick up animal hair better than a general-purpose model, and filter out fine particles. These machines come with a mini turbine tool to help remove pet hair, human hair and cotton fibres from upholstery, cars, and confined areas.
 Motorhead: cylinder or handheld model with direct-drive motorised brush head.
 Full Gear: same features as "Animal", with more attachments.
 Absolute: has a full range of tools and is typically the top-of-the-line model.

Special Edition models 
Other suffixes may indicate exclusivity to certain stores, e.g. "Comet Exclusive" and "Overdrive" (Comet) or "Blitz it" (Currys).

Some are limited editions:

"Drawing" limited editions 
These machines feature a different range of tools to the usual "Multifloor" and "Animal" versions and also appear in different colours. The Drawing later became exclusive to the British John Lewis Department Stores.

"De Stijl" limited editions 
Some of the early Dyson models (DC01, DC02, DC04) were available in a "De Stijl" colour scheme of purple, red and yellow, in homage to the Dutch design movement of the same name.

"Dyson Antarctic Solo" limited editions 
In 1996, 100,000 recoloured DC01 and DC02 models were produced as part of a fund-raising effort for Ranulph Fiennes's solo expedition to the Antarctic. For these models, the yellow parts found on the mainstream models were replaced with light blue ones, and on the DC02 Antarctic Solo the body was also recoloured in white instead of silver.

Current models 
v15 and v12 came out in 2022

Upright

Canister

Cordless

Other

Discontinued models

Upright

Cylinder

Cordless

Other

Airblade hand dryer

Airblade 

The first Dyson Airblade, launched in 2006, is a hand dryer for commercial customers, typically made available in public hand washing facilities. The Airblade uses Dyson's Digital Motor to produce a stream of air that flows at up to 430 mph (700 km/h) and is claimed to dry the hands in 10 to 12 seconds. The Airblade uses a HEPA filter to remove bacteria and mould from the air. The Dyson Airblade is the world's first hygienic commercial hand dryer according to NSF International; it is accredited by the British Skin Foundation and the Royal Institute of Public Health as well. The Dyson Airblade is hazard analysis and critical control points (HACCP) approved.

Airblade Wash+Dry 
Airblade Wash+Dry launched in 2013 is a tap with an integrated hand dryer

Air Multiplier bladeless fans and air purifiers 

The Dyson "Air Multiplier" was announced on 18 October 2009 as an electric fan, intended to provide smoother airflow and, having no exposed rotating blades, operating in a safer manner than conventional bladed fans. Like other bladeless fans, the apparatus itself has no visible blades, as they are concealed within the body of the product. The fan works by drawing air in through an inlet in the base pillar and forcing it through an outlet in the upper ring. The jet of air travels over the airfoil shape of the ring, creating local low pressure, thereby pulling air from behind it as it decelerates in a process known as "induction". Once the air exits the ring it entrains the air in front and alongside. Using this process, a small brushless impeller in the fan's base can power a much larger air outlet without exposing any blades.

Dyson stated that the initially-generated air flow is multiplied between 15 and 18 times for the models AM01, AM02 and AM03, projecting a smooth stream of uninterrupted air, without the buffeting effect caused by conventional fan blades. In March 2014, the second-generation models of the Air Multiplier were acoustically re-engineered so that the bladeless fans were quieter than their predecessors, using improved airflow and a Helmholtz resonator to cancel a 10 kHz whine.

Since the original release, Dyson has produced combination electrical heater and cooling fans (some with HEPA filters) based on its Air Multiplier design. In addition, some newer designs feature "Jet Focus", the ability to shift between a wide and shallow or a narrower but farther-reaching stream of air, under user control. Most of the Dyson fans and heaters are controlled by small infrared remote controls, which can be held magnetically on the appliance when not in use. A more-limited set of control switches is provided on the body of the appliance.

The design for a bladeless fan had been patented by Toshiba in 1981, but was not marketed before the patent expired. An initial patent claim by Dyson was rejected by the Intellectual Property Office, ruling that it "cannot be considered novel or cannot be considered to involve an inventive step" compared to the earlier patent.

The Air Multiplier fan received the Japanese Good Design Award in 2010.

In September 2011, Dyson announced the Dyson Hot fan heater (AM04), using Air Multiplier technology. Like most fan heaters, it has a thermostat to control the temperature, and can also be used as a cooling fan (without heat). All AM04 models made prior to 1 April 2014 are subject to a no-charge product recall for repairs because of a fire risk.

In March 2015, Dyson released their new Air Multiplier Humidifier. It uses "Ultraviolet Cleanse" technology to clean water by running it through ultraviolet light twice before it is released. A piezoelectric transducer in the base vibrates up to 1.7 million times a second to break the water down into small droplets which are drawn up and added to the air with Air Multiplier technology.

In January 2016, Dyson released the Dyson Pure Cool air purifier. It uses the same Air Multiplier technology to blow air, as well as a 0.99 micron HEPA filter to trap suspended particles. Along with a coarse filter to trap slow particles, the unit uses low-force velocity to trap fine particles within the filter as well.

, Dyson has discontinued its basic cooling fans in favour of an extended range of combination fan air purifiers, some with optional heating. High-end models feature automatic monitoring of indoor air quality for particulates and volatile organic compound (VOC) contamination, and reporting over Bluetooth or WiFi to a smartphone app.

Contrarotator washing machine 

The Dyson CR01 Contrarotator, first available in November 2000, was a washing machine with two counter-rotating drums, the first of its type. Each drum had 5,000 perforations to help evacuate water. Dyson's next washing machine, in 2004, was the CR02, with "Flowcheck" and "Allergy" models. The company stopped making washing machines in 2005 as they were unprofitable. As of November 2012, Dyson no longer supports or services the Contrarotator washing machines, which it has declared obsolete.

Hair care products 
In April 2016, Dyson introduced the "Supersonic" handheld hair dryer. A Dyson Digital Motor V9 is housed in the handle. In October 2018, the company launched the "Airwrap" styler, which uses the same motor as the Supersonic hair dryer, and is able to style wet hair using the Coandă effect. In March 2020, Dyson announced a cordless hair straightener called the "Corrale".

Lighting 
In 2015 Dyson introduced the "CSYS" range of LED lamps. The lamps incorporate heat pipe technology designed to extend the life of the product, by cooling the LED emitters.

In 2018, Dyson released the "Lightcycle", featuring the same heat pipe technology as the previous CSYS lights, but with Bluetooth connectivity via the Dyson Link app, and the ability to adjust the intensity and colour temperature to both the individual and their surroundings.

Medical care 
In March 2020, in light of the COVID-19 pandemic, Dyson announced that they would be supporting UK hospitals by manufacturing ventilators. On March 25, it was announced that the British government had ordered 10,000 units of The CoVent from the company, subject to passing stringent medical tests. The plan was cancelled a month later, after Dyson realized that it would be difficult for a company with no history of manufacturing ventilators to quickly obtain regulatory approval.

Wearables 
In March 2022, Dyson introduced Dyson Zone, a noise-cancelling headphone that doubles as an air purifier for the face.

See also

 List of vacuum cleaners

References

External links

 
Dyson products
Dyson
Dyson